Desmond Martin Clarke (born 13 January 1981) is a Scottish stand-up comedian and television/radio presenter. Clarke currently presents Heart Drivetime on Heart Scotland (weekdays from 4pm-7pm with co-host Jennifer Reoch from STV), and writes a weekly column in the Daily Record, and also presents the BBC Radio Scotland topical quiz show Breaking the News.

Early life
Clarke was raised in the Gorbals district of Glasgow and attended Holyrood Secondary School.

Career

Television
Clarke presented ITV's long running children's television show SMTV Live from March to December 2003, following the departure of Ant & Dec. He has hosted Whatever on Sky One, Discovery's Invention SOS and Club Cupid, the adult dating show on STV as well as fronting the Scottish coverage of Children in Need. Clarke has also been involved in sports broadcasting, appearing regularly on BBC One Scotland’s flagship football programmes, Offside and Sportscene as well as Sportsround on the CBBC Channel. At the end of 2007, Clarke hosted From SR to Lavvie Heid: How We Made the Break, an affectionate look at the top 50 adverts shown in Scotland since 1957 as part of the celebrations for STV's 50th birthday.

Clarke has also appeared in BBC One's Live Floor Show and BBC Two's World Cup's Most Shocking Moments. In 2014, Clarke was a panelist on CBBC's The Dog Ate My Homework. He is also a regular warm-up comedian for BBC Scotland. Clarke hosted the closing ceremony of the 2014 Commonwealth Games. In 2019, Clarke made a guest appearance in the first episode of the ninth series of Still Game.

Radio
Clarke spent three years as a DJ on Scottish radio station Beat 106, fronting the Breakfast Show and winning the Presenter of the Year at the British Radio Awards in 2004. Clarke later returned to Beat 106 under its new name of Xfm Scotland. On 7 November 2008, Xfm Scotland became Galaxy Scotland and on 10 November 2008, Clarke began hosting a weekday breakfast show with Vanessa Motion, Des & Vanessa @ Breakfast. On 3 January 2011, Galaxy Scotland was renamed and rebranded as Capital Scotland, where he became a breakfast co-presenter alongside Jennie Cook. He now presents with Steven Mill and Amy Irons. He left Capital Breakfast after Global Radio announced that Heart, Capital, and Smooth would be moving to all National Breakfast shows.

In 2015, Clarke began presenting the topical quiz show Breaking the News on Radio Scotland.

In March 2019, it was announced that Clarke would be moving to Heart Scotland as part of a reshuffle at Global Radio. Clarke presents the Heart Scotland Drivetime Show weekdays from 4pm-7pm after leaving Capital Breakfast.

Comedy
Clarke is a regular performer on the comedy circuit, playing venues such as The Stand, The Comedy Store and Jongleurs. Clarke has performed at the Edinburgh Festival Fringe since 2001 and the Glasgow International Comedy Festival. Clarke has also made appearances at the New York, Adelaide, Dubai and Dublin Comedy Festivals.

Theatre
In 2012, Clarke starred as the lead comic role, Buttons, in Cinderella, at the King's Theatre in Glasgow. He starred alongside Karen Dunbar as The Fairy Godmother and Gavin Mitchell as an Ugly Sister. He has been a regular Panto veteran at the King's Theatre starring alongside the likes of Gregor Fisher, Tony Roper, Greg McHugh and Juliet Cadzow.

References

External links
Official site
Des & Vanessa @ Breakfast at Galaxy Radio
Des Clarke at RDF Management
Capital Breakfast at capitalfm.com

Living people
1981 births
Comedians from Glasgow
BBC Radio Scotland presenters
Scottish television presenters
Scottish stand-up comedians
Capital (radio network)
People from Gorbals
People educated at Holyrood Secondary School
Scottish radio presenters